The 1938 New South Wales state election was for 90 electoral districts each returning a single member with compulsory preferential voting.

Results by electoral district

Albury

Annandale

Armidale 

 Preferences were not distributed.

Arncliffe

Ashburnham

Ashfield

Auburn

Balmain 

 Preferences were not distributed.

Bankstown

Barwon

Bathurst 

 Preferences were not distributed.

Bondi 

 Preferences were not distributed.

Botany

Bulli 

 Preferences were not distributed.

Burwood

Byron

Canterbury

Casino

Castlereagh

Cessnock

Clarence

Cobar

Concord

Coogee

Cootamundra

Corowa 

Christopher Lethbridge had won the seat at the 1937 by-election following the death of Richard Ball.

Croydon

Drummoyne

Dubbo

Dulwich Hill

Georges River

Glebe

Gloucester 

 Preferences were not distributed.

Gordon

Goulburn 

 Preferences were not distributed.

Granville

Hamilton

Hartley

Hawkesbury

Hornsby

Hurstville

Illawarra

King 

 Preferences were not distributed.

Kogarah 

 Preferences were not distributed.

Kurri Kurri

Lachlan

Lakemba

Lane Cove

Leichhardt 

 Preferences were not distributed.

Lismore

Liverpool Plains

Maitland

Manly 

 Preferences were not distributed.

Marrickville

Monaro

Mosman

Mudgee 

 Preferences were not distributed.

Murray

Murrumbidgee

Namoi

Nepean

Neutral Bay

Newcastle

Newtown

North Sydney

Orange

Oxley

Paddington

Parramatta

Petersham

Phillip

Raleigh 

 Preferences were not distributed.

Randwick

Redfern

Ryde 

 Preferences were not distributed.

South Coast

Sturt

Tamworth 

 Preferences were not distributed.

Temora

Tenterfield 

 Preferences were not distributed.

Upper Hunter

Vaucluse 

William Foster died and Murray Robson had been elected as an  candidate at the resulting by-election however he re-joined the United Australia party.

Wagga Wagga

Waratah

Waverley

Willoughby

Wollondilly

Woollahra 

The sitting member Sir Daniel Levy died in 1937. The resulting by-election was won by Harold Mason however he did not contest the election and the seat was regained by Vernon Treatt.

Yass

Young

See also 
 Candidates of the 1938 New South Wales state election
 Members of the New South Wales Legislative Assembly, 1938–1941

Notes

References 

1938